Paolo Baccio (born 23 September 1997) is an Italian professional racing cyclist, who last rode for UCI Continental team .

Major results
2016
 4th Time trial, National Under-23 Road Championships
2017
 8th Trofeo Piva
2018
 1st Trofeo Piva
 3rd Time trial, National Under-23 Road Championships
 4th Time trial, Mediterranean Games
2019
 3rd Gran Premio Industrie del Marmo

References

External links

1997 births
Living people
Italian male cyclists
Competitors at the 2018 Mediterranean Games
Mediterranean Games competitors for Italy
People from Avola
Sportspeople from the Province of Syracuse
Cyclists from Sicily
21st-century Italian people